"Left Right Out Of Your Heart" is a pop song written by Mort Garson, with lyrics by Earl Shuman. The best-known version was recorded by Patti Page in 1958.  This recording was released by Mercury Records as catalog number 71331. It first reached the Billboard magazine charts on June 30, 1958. On the Disk Jockey chart, it peaked at # 9; on the Best Seller chart, at # 14; on the "Hot 100" composite chart of the top 100 songs, it reached # 13. "Left Right Out of Your Heart" was Page's final Top Ten entry and certified Gold million seller until "Hush, Hush, Sweet Charlotte" became Page's last Top Ten hit and Gold million seller in 1965.

"Left Right Out of Your Heart" afforded Page a #6 hit in Australia.

References

Songs with lyrics by Earl Shuman
1958 singles
Patti Page songs
Songs written by Mort Garson
1958 songs
Mercury Records singles